Stella Cilento (Cilentan: Stella Ciliendo) is a town and comune in the province of Salerno in the Campania region of south-western Italy. Its name means Star of Cilento in the Italian language.

Geography
Stella, named after the neighbouring mountain, is located in the middle of Cilento. It borders with the municipalities of Casal Velino, Omignano, Pollica and Sessa Cilento. It counts the frazioni of Amalafede, Droro, Guarrazzano and San Giovanni.

See also
Monte Stella
Cilento and Vallo di Diano National Park

References

External links

Cities and towns in Campania
Localities of Cilento